Uszód is a village in Bács-Kiskun county, in the Southern Great Plain region of southern Hungary.

History
The village was first mentioned in historical records in 1318.

Geography

Economy
The economy is primarily based on agriculture. The village has a village hall.

References

Populated places in Bács-Kiskun County